The 1914–15 Northern Football League season was the 26th in the history of the Northern Football League, a football competition in Northern England.

Clubs

The league featured 11 clubs which competed in the last season, along with two new clubs: 
 Harrogate
 Scarborough, joined from the Yorkshire Combination

League table

References

1914-15
North